Rex Frederick (born December 16, 1936 in Hamilton, Alabama
) is a retired American collegiate basketball player and coach. He was a star athlete in high school along with his brother Max Frederick and led Corner High School in Jefferson County to the Alabama state championship. He later attended Auburn University and holds the record as all-time leading rebounder with 14.3 rebounds per game average and his 904 career rebounds currently ranks fifth on the Tigers' all-time rebounding chart. In 2006, he became only the third Tiger to have his jersey (#32) retired.

He left Auburn as the all-time leading rebounder and ninth all-time leading scorer with 937 points and continues to hold the top two single-season records for most rebounds with 325 in 1957–1958 and 322 in 1956–1957. Frederick holds the Auburn single-game record for rebounds with 27 vs. SMU in 1957.

In 1966 he joined the staff at the new state university, South Alabama and helped them organize and begin its basketball program in 1968. He served as head coach for two seasons.

College career
Frederick played collegiately at Auburn (1956–1959), helping the freshman team to an undefeated season . As a junior, he set single-season record with 325 rebounds and also set the single game rebounding mark with 27. When he graduated from Auburn, he ranked as Auburn's third best rebounder with a total of 904, averaging 14.3 rebounds per game. He averaged 14.9 points a game for his career and had a career total of 937 points. He was chosen All-SEC two consecutive years (1958 and 1959) and was voted to the
Associated Press and Helms All-America teams his senior year. In 1959, he was voted SEC Defensive Player of the Year. Frederick was also All-SEC in baseball and led Auburn to an SEC Championship. He is a member of Auburn's Basketball Hall of Fame and has been inducted into the Tiger Trail of Auburn by the Chamber of Commerce. He coached in college for a while, starting the basketball program at the University of South Alabama in 1966. He currently resides in Auburn, AL.

Coaching career
Frederick organized and started the South Alabama Jaguars basketball team in 1966. From 1968–1970 he served as the Jaguars founding head coach and compiled a 19–29 (.396) record.

Awards
1957 All-SEC
1958 All-SEC
1958 Team Captain
1959 All-SEC
1959 Team Captain
1959 Associated Press All-American
1959 Helms All-American
1959 SEC Defensive Player of the Year
2003 Inductee Alabama Sports Hall of Fame
Auburn University All-Century Team
Member of Auburn's Basketball Hall of Fame
Inducted into the Tiger Trail of Auburn by the Chamber of Commerce

References

External links
http://www.ashof.org/ Alabama Sports Hall of Fame
Auburn Tigers Athletics
South Alabama Athletics

1936 births
Living people
American men's basketball coaches
American men's basketball players
Auburn Tigers men's basketball players
Basketball coaches from Alabama
Basketball players from Alabama
People from Hamilton, Alabama
Power forwards (basketball)
South Alabama Jaguars men's basketball coaches